Anna Sparre, born 1980, is a Swedish kitesurfer. She was, together with Christian Dittrich, the first Swede to enter the world cup (PKRA) in 2003.

She obtained a few good results in the two kitesurfing world cups, PKRA and KPWT, during the years 2003 to 2005, among others a third place in a KPWT freestyle competition.

Anna Sparre has also won the titles Nordic kitesurfing champion and Swedish kitesurfing champion. However, she is more known for being one of the first female riders learning progressive tricks such as handlepass and flat 360 as well as for her waveriding.

References

1980 births
Living people
Swedish kitesurfers
Female kitesurfers
Swedish sportswomen